Vaikom Saraswathi was a South-Indian Carnatic singer and a Playback singer Her Carnatic songs have been published in gramophone records.

Radio concerts 
Her Carnatic music concerts have been broadcast over All India Radio stations.

Playback singer
Though playback singing was introduced to Tamil films in 1938 (Nandakumar), it became popular after Sri Valli (1945). K. V. Mahadevan introduced Vaikom Saraswathi as playback singer in the 1947 film Dhana Amaravathi. She sang 3 songs - Kandenadi, Un Thiruvarul and Azhagai - for B. S. Saroja. She also sang 2 songs - Vaarum Indha Verlai and Saedhi Enna - for the 1948 film Jambam.

Sibling 
Vaikkom Saraswathi's brother, Rajan was also a playback singer. The song Swantham viyarpinaal.. sung by Rajan for the 1951 film Yachakan became popular. Soon after the recording for this film, Rajan died due to illness.

References

External links 
 - A Classical song sung by Vaikom Saraswathi
 - A song from the film Dhana Amaravathi

Women Carnatic singers
Carnatic singers
Tamil playback singers
Tamil singers
Indian women classical singers
20th-century Indian singers
Indian women playback singers
20th-century Indian women singers